Bowesmont is an unincorporated community in Pembina County, North Dakota, United States. The community was initially named Alma for Alma, Ontario in 1878; the name was changed to Bowesmont, for William Bowes, the town's first shopkeeper, six months later. According to legend, Bowes won the right to name the town in a card game.

Bowesmont was devastated by flooding of the Red River in 1997. Only an old church and a small trucking outfit are left, with no residential area. An annual pilgrimage occurs the second Sunday of July where old friends, family and neighbors meet in the old church to celebrate what was the town they loved.

Notable person
Harold Keith Johnson, Chief of Staff of the United States Army from 1964 to 1968

References

External links
Pioneer Women's Histories : Drayton and Bowesmont from the Digital Horizons website

Unincorporated communities in Pembina County, North Dakota
Unincorporated communities in North Dakota